Adolf Henrik Lundin, (19 December 1932 – 30 September 2006), was a Swedish oil and mining entrepreneur. From the 1970s through the 1990s Lundin established numerous natural resource companies both in the mining sector and the oil and gas sector, which in turn made a number of significant discoveries in the Middle East, Africa, Europe and South America. Several of these deposits are still producing commercial quantities of oil, gas, gold, copper and other minerals; others are still under development. Lundin made a fortune in the 1970s when he came across huge natural gas fields in Qatar.

Biography

Early years

Adolf Lundin earned a master's degree in 1956 from the Royal Institute of Technology in Stockholm. Between 1957 and 1960 he worked as a Petroleum Engineer for the Royal Dutch Shell Group in South America. In 1961 he earned an MBA degree from the Centre d’Etudes Industrielles in Geneva, Switzerland. Between 1961 and 1966 he was responsible for oil exploration activities in the North Sea and Portugal for the Ax:son Johnson Group. In 1966, he moved with his family to Geneva to work as assistant director of the Centre d’Etudes Industrielles (which later became the International Institute for Management Development).

Adolf's brother Bertil (1946-2005) was head of the Kontoret för Särskild Inhämtning (The Office for Special Collection). The KSI is Sweden's most secretive intelligence agency.

Career

In 1971, he started his career as an independent oil and mining entrepreneur on a global scale. His first successful venture was Gulfstream Resources which, in 1976, co-discovered the North Gas Field, offshore Qatar - this field remains today as the single largest known gas accumulation in the world.

Lundin was an ardent anti-communist. In the United States Lundin was involved with the conservative think tank, The Heritage Foundation based in Washington, D.C. (Reagan Doctrine/ Kirkpatrick Doctrine). In 1980, Lundin sponsored Ronald Reagan's election campaign. Lundin and his wife Eva were invited to the Reagan inauguration in 1981. The program included an inauguration party with Frank Sinatra that the couple watched from the front row.

He founded Lundin Mining in 1994.

In 1998, he was named International Swede of the Year by His Majesty the King of Sweden. In 1999, Lundin Oil, made a major discovery of oil in the Thar Jath structure in an area in Sudan (Block 5A). In 2000, Lundin invited the former prime minister (1991-1994) and EU envoy to the Balkans (1995) Carl Bildt to join his board of directors. In 2001 Lundin founded Lundin Petroleum.

In 2002, he received an honorary doctorate from Plekhanov Russian Academy of Economics in Moscow. He became the honorary chairman of Lundin Petroleum AB, the chairman of Vostok Nafta Investment Ltd and a director of North Atlantic Natural Resources AB, Atacama Minerals Corp., Champion Resources Inc., South Atlantic Ventures Ltd, Tenke Mining Corp. and Valkyries Petroleum Corp.

Adolf Lundin died in 2006, aged 73, from leukemia. He and his wife, Eva Wehtje, whom he married in 1957, had four children. His Lundin Group, continued by his sons Lukas Lundin and Ian Lundin. They have invested considerable resources in rebranding the Lundin Group to make it more socially acceptable. They started a philanthropic operation, "Lundin for Africa Foundation", and proclaimed in 2007 to donate $100 million to the Clinton Foundation.

Books 

Adolf H. Lundin: Biography by ULF Lundin Petroleum Giraffetink
 (Business in Blood and Oil: Lundin Petroleum in Africa)

External links

References

1932 births
2006 deaths
Deaths from leukemia
Businesspeople from Geneva
KTH Royal Institute of Technology alumni
Swedish anti-communists
20th-century Swedish businesspeople
Deaths from cancer in Switzerland
Place of birth missing
Adolf